Huang Gongwang (1269–1354), birth name Lu Jian, was Chinese painter, poet, and writer born at the end of the Song dynasty in Changshu, Jiangsu. He was the oldest of the "Four Masters of the Yuan dynasty".

Biography 
At the age of 10, the Song dynasty fell to the Yuan dynasty and he, like many other Chinese scholars of the time, found his path to officialdom and a good career severely limited. "He was first an unranked ling-shih at a Surveillance Office in the Chiang-che Branch Secretariat (Province), probably engaged in some sort of land tax supervision. Later he served as a secretary in the metropolitan Censorate where he was unfortunately involved in the slander case of a minister, Chang Lu. He seems to have spent quite some time in jail before retreating into Taoism [as did many others of the age--another was the famous painter Ni Zan], completely disillusioned." He spent his last years in the Fu-ch'un mountains near Hangzhou devoting himself to Taoism, where around 1350 he completed one of his most famous, and arguably greatest, works, Dwelling in the Fuchun Mountains.

In art he rejected the landscape conventions of his era's Academy, but is now regarded as one of the great literati painters. Art historian James Cahill identified Huang Gongwang as the artist who "most decisively altered the course of landscape painting, creating models that would have a profound effect on landscapists of later centuries." One of Huang Gongwang's strongest influences was his technique of using very dry brush strokes together with light ink washes (when colour is applied to a specific area using a soft-haired brush with wide strokes that blend them together into a unified wash) to build up his landscape paintings. He also wrote a treatise on landscape painting, Secrets of Landscape Painting (Xiě Shānshuǐ Jué).

As was typical for Chinese scholar-officials of his era, he also wrote poetry and had some talent for music.

References

 Masterpieces of Chinese Art (pages 87–90), by Rhonda and Jeffrey Cooper, Todtri Productions, 1997. 
 James Cahill, "The Yuan Dynasty" in Three Thousand Years of Chinese Painting, ed. by Yang Xin, Richard M. Barnhart, et al. Yale University Press, 1997.
 Sherman E. Lee and Wai-Kam Ho. Chinese Art Under the Mongols: The Yuan Dynasty (1279-1368). The Cleveland Museum of Art, 1968.

External links
 Landscapes Clear and Radiant: The Art of Wang Hui (1632-1717), an exhibition catalog from The Metropolitan Museum of Art (fully available online as PDF), which contains material on Huang Gongwang (see index)
 Huang Gongwang and "Dwelling in the Fuchun Mountains" at the National Palace Museum

1269 births
1354 deaths
Burials in Suzhou
Chinese scholars
Painters from Suzhou
People from Changshu
Poets from Jiangsu
Writers from Suzhou
Yuan dynasty painters
Yuan dynasty poets
Yuan dynasty Taoists